Paraivongius bicolor is a species of leaf beetle of Angola and the Democratic Republic of the Congo. It was first described from Landana by Édouard Lefèvre in 1885.

Subspecies
There are two subspecies of P. bicolor:

 Paraivongius bicolor arussinus (Gestro, 1895)
 Paraivongius bicolor bicolor (Lefèvre, 1885)

References

Eumolpinae
Beetles of the Democratic Republic of the Congo
Beetles described in 1885
Taxa named by Édouard Lefèvre
Insects of Angola